The 2016–17 season was the club's 4th season in the Scottish Premiership and their fifth consecutive appearance in the top flight of Scottish football. Ross County also competed in the Scottish Cup and the League Cup, having won the League Cup the previous year for the first time in their history.

Season summary
County were unable to retain the trophy after being knocked out of the Group Stages in a new format introduced by the SPFL. 
County U20s won the Development League, managed by Stuart Kettlewell. 
Liam Boyce finished the season on 23 league goals and was the top goalscorer in the Scottish Premiership.

Results and fixtures

Pre-season

Scottish Premiership

League Cup

Scottish Cup

Squad statistics

Appearances

|-
|colspan="10"|Players who left the club during the 2016–17 season
|-

|}

Goalscorers

Disciplinary record

Team statistics

League table

Transfers

In

Out

See also
 List of Ross County F.C. seasons

Notes and references

Ross County F.C. seasons
Ross County